Mansuriyeh (also Romanized as Manşūrīyeh) is a village in Darbqazi Rural District, in the Central District of Nishapur County, Razavi Khorasan Province, Iran. At the 2006 census, its population was 25, in 5 families.

References 

Populated places in Nishapur County